SSRG may refer to:

 Georgian Soviet Socialist Republic
 Seaside Siren Roller Girls
 Sheffield Steel Rollergirls
 Steel Shop Recovery Group (SSRG)
 Sun State Roller Girls